The 36 Boys were a gang of primarily Turkish immigrants from Berlin-Kreuzberg.

The gang was active from the late 1980s until the mid-1990s. Besides Turkish, other nationalities were also represented in the large gang. The gang operated in the area around the Kottbusser Tor to the residential areas between the Naunynstraße and Waldemarstraße, as well as up to the Görlitzer Bahnhof. The graffiti of the 36 Boys were distributed throughout Berlin. In Kreuzberg, they served also to mark the gang's "turf". The gang took its name from the former Berlin postal borough Südost 36 or SO 36. The idea for the name of the gang came from Attila Murat Aydın, a founder of the Berlin rap scene, who was murdered in 2003 by a 76 year old man who was later acquitted on grounds of self defence.

In addition to the 36 Boys there were the "36 Juniors", who showed a higher potential of violence. In the beginning of the 1990s the 36 Boys fought against turf battles with Nazis and Skinheads in the Jungfernheide park. Other rival gangs were the Warriors from the Schlesisches Tor and the Black Panthers from Wedding. During the May riots in Kreuzberg, the 36 Boys initially joined the Autonomists, but the alliance was short-lived because of the group's lack of political orientation.

In 2007 the Berlin Senate employed former members of the 36 Boys as Kiezläufer ("neighbour walkers") in Kreuzberg to help prevent juvenile delinquency. The area around the Naunynstraße, the centre of the gang, was declared a no-go area by the Senate.

After the dissolution of the gang the former gang members went their separate ways. Some remained in the criminal milieu, others such as the cook Tim Raue - awarded by the Gault Millau - turned to lawful careers. Some became social workers in local housing projects and youth centres. Former member Sinan Tosun has opened a shop near Kottbusser Tor in which he sells clothes with 36 Boys logos. His brother, professional boxer Muzaffer Tosun, was also a member of the 36 Boys, as were the rapper Killa Hakan and the author, film director and media educator Neco Çelik.

In the German media, the gang is depicted as the prototypical gang of immigrant background.

References

Sources 
 Klaus Farin and Eberhard Seidel-Pielen. Krieg in den Städten: Jugendgangs in Deutschland. Berlin: Rotbuch, 1991.  
 Murat Güngör and Hannes Loh. Fear of a Kanak planet: HipHop zwischen Weltmusik und Nazi-Rap. Planegg: Hannibal, 2002.  

This article is based on a translation of the equivalent article on the German Wikipedia.

Gangs in Germany
German people of Turkish descent
Street gangs